Gold of the Seven Saints is a 1961 American Western film adaptation of a 1957 Steve Frazee novel titled Desert Guns. Released by Warner Brothers, the 88-minute film starred Clint Walker, Roger Moore, Letícia Román, Robert Middleton, and Chill Wills. It was directed by Gordon Douglas, who had earlier directed Walker in 1958's Fort Dobbs and 1959's Yellowstone Kelly. Leigh Brackett wrote the screenplay and Joseph F. Biroc provided the black-and-white photography, most of which was shot in and around Arches National Park in Utah. The film did not do very well at the box office.

Plot
Two fur traders, Jim Rainbolt (Clint Walker) and Shaun Garrett (Roger Moore), stumble across a big gold strike. With the ruthless bandit McCracken (Gene Evans) and his men in relentless pursuit, they hide the gold behind a giant boulder. Shaun is wounded, but Doc Gates (Chill Wills) shows up out of nowhere and patches him up and is made a full partner. They take refuge at the ranch of Amos Gondora, an old friend of Jim's. There they are introduced to Gondora's so-called "ward", an Indian maiden called Tita (Letícia Román). That night some of McCracken's men stage a stampede and draw Jim and Gondora away. While they are gone, McCracken and some men ride up and take Shaun and Doc captive. He kills Doc because he is unable to tell the hiding place of the gold.

Shaun does not know how to find the hiding place and even under torture cannot lead anyone to the gold. Rainbolt tracks and finds McCracken and his men. After a shootout, McCracken is the only one left of his gang, but he has a gun to Shaun's head and compels Rainbolt to lead him to the gold. When they get there, Rainbolt feigns being unable to move the boulder alone, drawing McCracken in close enough for Rainbolt to roll another boulder onto McCracken's leg, trapping him. Rainbolt and Garrett intend to leave McCracken there to die, but Gondora and his men show up.

Everything seems all right until Gondora puts friendship aside and demands the gold for himself. Jim and Shaun run from them and must cross a rushing river to get away. The bags of gold fall apart and the gold is lost in the river where it came from. After they laugh at this turn of events, Gondora pledges his friendship again and Rainbolt and Garrett set out to return to their fur trapping.

Cast
 Clint Walker as Jim Rainbolt
 Roger Moore as Shaun Garrett
 Robert Middleton as Gondora
 Chill Wills as Doc Gates
 Letícia Román as Tita
 Gene Evans as McCracken
 Roberto Contreras as Armenderez, Gondora Gunman
 Jack Williams as Ames
 Art Stewart as Ricca
 Nestor Paiva as Gondora Henchman
 Christopher Dark as Frank
 Lalo Rios as Mexican Robber
 Vito Scotti as Gondara's Cook

Production
Parts of the film were shot in Professor Valley, Fisher Towers, Arches, Dead Horse Point, Kane Creek Canyon, King's Bottom, Sevenmile Wash, and Klondike Flats in Utah.

See also
 List of American films of 1961

References

External links
 
 
 
 

1961 films
Warner Bros. films
American black-and-white films
Films based on American novels
Films based on Western (genre) novels
Films directed by Gordon Douglas
Films with screenplays by Leigh Brackett
1961 Western (genre) films
American Western (genre) films
Films shot in Utah
1960s English-language films
1960s American films